Darwin Thompson (born February 12, 1997) is an American football running back for the Seattle Seahawks of the National Football League (NFL). He played college football at Northeastern Oklahoma A&M College before transferring to Utah State and was drafted by the Kansas City Chiefs in the sixth round of the 2019 NFL Draft. Thompson won a Super Bowl title as part of the Chiefs in Super Bowl LIV.

Early life
Thompson grew up in Tulsa, Oklahoma and attended Jenks High School. As a senior in 2014, he rushed for 942 yards and 10 touchdowns on 152 carries as the backup running back, and helped the team win a Class 6A-I state championship. As a football prospect, he was rated as a three-star recruit and the 16th highest rated recruit in the state of Oklahoma by the 247Sports Composite.

College career
Thompson received zero NCAA Division I scholarship offers coming out of high school. He enrolled at Northeastern Oklahoma A&M, a junior college in Miami, Oklahoma, and redshirted the 2015 season. As a redshirt freshman in 2016, he posted 1,029 rushing yards and nine touchdowns on 150 attempts. As a redshirt sophomore in 2017, he was named Offensive MVP of the Southwest Junior Football Conference and an NJCAA second-team All-American after he ran for 1,391 yards and eight touchdowns on the year. His 2,420 career rushing yards is the second-most in Northeastern Oklahoma A&M school history.

Coming out of junior college, Thompson was again rated as a three-star recruit, ranked as the best JUCO all-purpose back in the country by 247Sports. He committed to play at Utah State on December 17, 2017.

Thompson played one season at Utah State, starting in nine games and playing in 13 during the 2018 season. On November 3, he rushed for a career high 140 yards and three touchdowns against Hawaii, and was named Mountain West Conference Offensive Player of the Week. He rushed for 1,044 yards and 14 touchdowns on 153 attempts on the year, and was named second-team All-Mountain West Conference.

Professional career

Kansas City Chiefs
Thompson was drafted by the Kansas City Chiefs in the sixth round with the 214th overall pick in the 2019 NFL Draft. As a rookie, Thompson appeared in 12 games and recorded 37 carries for 128 rushing yards and one rushing touchdown to go along with nine receptions for 43 receiving yards. In the Divisional Round of the playoffs against the Houston Texans, Thompson recovered a fumble forced by teammate Daniel Sorensen on punt returner DeAndre Carter during the 51–31 win. The Chiefs went on to win Super Bowl LIV after defeating the San Francisco 49ers 31–20 to give Thompson his first championship.

In Week 17 of the 2020 season against the Los Angeles Chargers, Thompson recorded 110 yards from scrimmage, one rushing touchdown, and one receiving touchdown during the 38–21 loss. He was released on August 31, 2021.

Tampa Bay Buccaneers
On September 2, 2021, Thompson signed with the Tampa Bay Buccaneers as part of their practice squad. He was released on January 13, 2022.

Kansas City Chiefs (second stint)
Thompson was signed to the Kansas City Chiefs practice squad on January 14, 2022.

Seattle Seahawks
On February 16, 2022, Thompson signed a reserve/future contract with the Seattle Seahawks. He was waived on August 30, 2022 and signed to the practice squad the next day. He signed a reserve/future contract on January 17, 2023.

Personal life
Darwin is the son of Rueben and Lashonne Thompson. He is the nephew of former St. Louis Rams and Oklahoma State running back David Thompson. Thompson is a Christian.

References

External links
Kansas City Chiefs bio
Utah State Aggies bio
Northeastern Oklahoma A&M Golden Norsemen bio

1997 births
Living people
American football running backs
Kansas City Chiefs players
Northeastern Oklahoma A&M Golden Norsemen football players
People from Jenks, Oklahoma
Players of American football from Oklahoma
Seattle Seahawks players
Tampa Bay Buccaneers players
Utah State Aggies football players